The canton of Châlons-en-Champagne-1 is an administrative division of the Marne department, northeastern France. Its borders were modified at the French canton reorganisation which came into effect in March 2015. Its seat is in Châlons-en-Champagne.

It consists of the following communes:
Châlons-en-Champagne (partly)
Compertrix
Coolus
Fagnières

References

Cantons of Marne (department)